The 2018 NAB AFL Women's Under-18 Championships was played between May and July 2018, with six teams competing in the main 'Series 2' round robin tournament and with a further four playing in a two-match on-on-one exhibition as the competition's initial 'Series 1'.

Format
The competition was opened with 'Series 1', a set of closed competitions between four pairs of teams representing the country's eight largest states and territories. In 'Series 2' teams representing Vic Country, Vic Metro, Queensland and Western Australia were joined by Central and Eastern Allies teams representing teams of the combined regions of Northern Territory and South Australia (Central) as well as New South Wales, ACT and Tasmania (Eastern). Each team played a total of three matches in that series.

Vic Country finished the round-robin 'Series 2' as the only team undefeated in that series, making them the de facto tournament winners. The competition's best player award was jointly won by Vic Country's Nina Morrison and by the previous year's outright winner, Madison Prespakis of Vic Metro.

Fixture

Series 1

Series 2

All-Australian team
The 2018 Women's All-Australian team was decided following an all-star exhibition match between members of the 48-player squad. 13 of the players named were 'top-aged' and draft eligible that year, while the remaining nine were 'bottom-aged'.

Initial squad

 NSW/ACT: Brianna McFarlane, Alexia Hamilton, Alyce Parker

 Northern Territory: Janet Baird

 Queensland: Lauren Bella, Belle Dawes, Kitara Farrar, Nat Grider, Tori Groves-Little, Charlotte Hammans, Dee Heslop, Lily Postlethwaite, Serene Watson, Jacqui Yorston

 South Australia: Nikki Gore, Montana McKinnon, Katelyn Rosenzweig

 Tasmania: Mia King

 Victoria Country: Jordyn Allen, Rene Caris, Georgia Clarke, Lucinda Cripps, Tyla Hanks, Courtney Jones, Lucy McEvoy, Nina Morrison, Olivia Purcell, Denby Taylor, Sophie Van De Heuvel, Rebecca Webster

 Victoria Metro: Daisy Bateman, Eleanor Brown, Mikala Cann, Isabella Grant, Katie Lynch, Hannah McLaren, Abbie McKay, Georgia MacPherson, Gabby Newton, Georgia Patrikios, Madison Prespakis, Emerson Woods

 Western Australia: Kate Bartlett, Mikayla Bowen, McKenzie Dowrick, Sabreena Duffy, Rikki Ryan-Carling, Matilda Sergeant

Team MVPs
At the conclusion of the tournament each competing team named their best player for the tournament. The winner of these 'most valuable player' awards are as follows:

References

2018
2018 in Australian rules football
2018 in Australian women's sport